Ian Carlos Gonçalves de Matos (24 April 1989 – 21 December 2021), was a Brazilian diver. He competed in the men's synchronized 3 metre springboard at the 2016 Summer Olympics, where he and Luiz Outerelo finished 8th out of 8 teams.  He won three bronzes at the 2010 South American Games. He died from lung infection on 21 December 2021, at the age of 32 in Rio de Janeiro.

Notes

References

External links

1989 births
2021 deaths
Brazilian male divers
Olympic divers of Brazil
Divers at the 2016 Summer Olympics
South American Games bronze medalists for Brazil
South American Games medalists in diving
Competitors at the 2010 South American Games
Divers at the 2015 Pan American Games
Divers at the 2019 Pan American Games
Gay sportsmen
Pan American Games competitors for Brazil
Matos
Sportspeople from Pará
Deaths from lung disease
Infectious disease deaths in Rio de Janeiro (state)
21st-century Brazilian people
LGBT divers